Events from the year 1867 in France.

Incumbents
 Monarch – Napoleon III

Events
1 January - Napoleon III announces liberal reforms.
13 January - French military mission to Japan (1867–68) arrives in Yokohama.
February - Strike of bronzeworkers in Paris.
5 February - Second French intervention in Mexico: French troops evacuate from the capital; on 12 March the last French forces leave the country.
1 April–3 November - Exposition Universelle in Paris.
10 April - Victor Duruy introduces legislation for female education.
6 June - Polish nationalist émigré Antoni Berezowski makes an attempt on the lives of Tsar Alexander II of Russia and Emperor Napoleon III in the Bois de Boulogne.
7 June - Adolphe Dugléré prepares the Three Emperors Dinner.
25 June - The provinces of Châu Đốc, Hà Tiên and Vĩnh Long, ceded by Annam, are added to French Cochinchina.
24 July - Law on Sociétés anonymes.
Pierre Michaux invents the front wheel-driven velocipede, the first mass-produced bicycle.

Births
21 January - Maxime Weygand, military commander (died 1965)
14 April - René Boylesve, author (died 1926)
17 May - Georgette Agutte, painter (died 1922)
3 October - Pierre Bonnard, painter and printmaker (died 1947)

Deaths
14 January - Jean Auguste Dominique Ingres, painter (born 1780)
17 January - Jacques Amand Eudes-Deslongchamps, naturalist and palaeontologist (born 1794)
31 May - Théophile-Jules Pelouze, chemist (born 1807)
11 June - Jean Pierre Pellissier, missionary to Southern Africa (born 1808)
7 July - François Ponsard, dramatist (born 1814)
31 July - Benoît Fourneyron, engineer, designed the first practical water turbine (born 1802)
23 August - Auguste-Marseille Barthélemy, satirical poet (born 1796)
31 August - Charles Baudelaire, poet, critic and translator (born 1821)
5 October - Achille Fould, financier and politician (born 1800)
15 October - Louis Eugène Marie Bautain, philosopher and theologian (born 1796)
28 November - Jean-Charles-Alphonse Avinain, "The Terror of Gonesse", serial killer, executed (born 1798)
6 December - Jean Pierre Flourens, physiologist (born 1794)
22 December - Jean-Victor Poncelet, engineer and mathematician (born 1788)
Full date unknown - Auguste Belloc, photographer (born 1800)

References

1860s in France